South Saturn Delta is a posthumous compilation album by American rock musician Jimi Hendrix. Released in 1997 by Experience Hendrix (operated by his estate), it consists of material such as demo tapes, unfinished takes and alternate mixes, and previously released material, most of which Hendrix had been working on prior to his death in 1970.

Background
Released prior to South Saturn Delta, First Rays of the New Rising Sun was Experience Hendrix's attempt at presenting Hendrix's planned fourth studio album.  The album consists of songs previously released on his first posthumous albums The Cry of Love (1971), Rainbow Bridge (1971), and War Heroes (1972).  South Saturn Delta collects five songs from the latter two then out-of-print albums that were not selected for First Rays.

Other tracks include "The Stars That Play with Laughing Sam's Dice", an early Jimi Hendrix Experience B-side single that saw release on the UK compilations Smash Hits (1968) and Loose Ends (1974), but never officially released in the US.  Alternate takes and mixes of previously released songs and demos for new songs that Hendrix may or may not have completed for release flesh out the album.

Critical reception 

In a review for Rolling Stone, David Fricke viewed South Saturn Delta as an inconsistent compilation that is "less of a mess" than the albums that preceded it but does not explore deep enough into Hendrix's recordings. Robert Christgau wrote in Blender, "it establishes the listenability of Hendrix's dribs and drabs", despite being "discographically presumptuous". AllMusic senior editor Stephen Thomas Erlewine said the album serves as an attempt to "capture the full range of Hendrix's music through an alternate history ... an intelligently sequenced, listenable collection of some of the very best outtakes and rarities from Hendrix". James P. Wisdom from Pitchfork found the songs full of Hendrix's growing embrace of fusing rock, blues, and jazz sounds "in ways that had never been considered".

Track listing

Personnel
Jimi Hendrixguitar, vocals, bass guitar (tracks 4, 7 and 8)
Mitch Mitchelldrums (tracks 1-4, 6-10, 13 and 14)
Noel Reddingbass guitar (tracks 1, 3, 9 and 10)
Billy Coxbass guitar (tracks 5, 6, 12, 13 and 14), backing vocals (track 5)

Additional Personnel
Rocky Isaacdrums (track 12)
Brian Jonespercussion (track 7)
Larry Leeguitar (track 6)
Dave Mason12-string guitar (track 8)
Buddy Milesdrums and backing vocals (track 5)
Juma Sultanpercussion (track 6)
Jerry Velezpercussion (track 6)
Unknown horn players2 trumpets, 2 saxophones, arranged by Larry Fallon (track 4)

Recording details

References

Sources

External links 
 

Compilation albums published posthumously
Jimi Hendrix compilation albums
1997 compilation albums
MCA Records compilation albums